Duncan Eric Sinclair (born 13 January 1954 in Haggs) is a Scottish former footballer, who played for Dundee, St Mirren and Airdrie in the Scottish Football League. Sinclair represented the Scottish League once, in 1980.

Sinclair finished his playing career in Junior football and is currently the manager of Kilsyth Rangers.

References

Sources

1954 births
Living people
Footballers from Falkirk (council area)
Association football forwards
Scottish footballers
Kilsyth Rangers F.C. players
Dundee F.C. players
St Mirren F.C. players
Airdrieonians F.C. (1878) players
Linlithgow Rose F.C. players
Scottish Football League players
Scottish Football League representative players
Scottish Junior Football Association players
Armadale Thistle F.C. non-playing staff